On 8 January 1916 the Russian dreadnought Imperatritsa Ekaterina Velikaya and the Ottoman battlecruiser Yavuz Sultan Selim encountered one another in the Black Sea. After a brief exchange of fire the Ottomans withdrew.

Battle
On 8 January 1916, Yavuz Sultan Selim was scheduled to arrive off of Zonguldak to cover the entrance of the empty  collier . As she was returning to the Bosporus, Yavuz spotted the two destroyers and gave chase. The destroyers retreated and radioed a warning to the recently commissioned dreadnought Imperatritsa Ekaterina II, which increased speed to come to their aid.

The Russian battleship fired 96 rounds and scored no hits, though some near misses did cause splinter damage to the battlecruiser. The Ottomans fired 60 rounds, but couldn't bring their 11-inch guns into range, and withdrew after 30 minutes. The Russians attempted to pursue, but the Yavuz was faster and outran them.

Aftermath
The engagement was the only ever battle between dreadnoughts on the Black Sea. Though the incident was only a minor confrontation, it solidified Russia's  naval superiority and deeply troubled Admiral Souchon. Already outnumbered and outclassed in cruisers, destroyers, and torpedo boats, the Ottomans no longer held a dreadnought advantage over the Russian Empire. From then on Russia would continue consolidate its hold on the Black Sea  and Yavuz would eventually shift her operations to the Dardanelles.

References

Naval battles of World War I involving Russia
Naval battles of World War I involving the Ottoman Empire
Black Sea naval operations of World War I
Conflicts in 1916
January 1916 events